The Dekemvriana ("December events") refers to a series of clashes fought during World War II in Athens from 3 December 1944 to 11 January 1945.

Regardless of the tensions between the left and the right, in May 1944 it had been roughly agreed in the Lebanon Conference that all non-collaborationist factions would participate in a Government of National Unity; eventually 6 out of 24 ministers were appointed by EAM.  Additionally, a few weeks before the withdrawal of the German troops in October 1944, it had been reaffirmed in the Caserta Agreement that all collaborationist forces would be tried and punished accordingly; and that all resistance forces would participate in the formation of the new Greek Army, under the command of the British.  Yet, on December 1, the British commander Ronald Scobie ordered the unilateral disarmament of EAM-ELAS. The EAM ministers resigned on the 2nd of December and EAM called for a rally in central Athens on the 3rd, requesting the immediate punishment of the collaborationist Security Battalions and the withdrawal of the "Scobie order". The rally of some 200,000 people was shot at by the Greek Police and Gendarmerie, leaving 28 protesters dead and 148 wounded.  These killings ushered a full-blown armed confrontation between EAM and the Government forces at first (which included the Security Battalions), and during the second half of December, between EAM and the British military forces.

The clashes were limited to Athens, while elsewhere in Greece the situation remained tense but peaceful, with the exception of Epirus where Aris Velouchiotis attacked the forces of Napoleon Zervas.

The Dekemvriana ended with the defeat of EAM-ELAS, leading to its disarmament in the Varkiza Agreement which marked the end of ELAS. This first defeat broke the power of EAM. This together with the EAM-instigated "Red Terror", was followed by a period of "White Terror" against the Left, which contributed to the outbreak of the Greek Civil War in 1946. The clashes of Dekemvriana were among the bloodiest battles in modern Greek history, with a high rate of civilians deaths.

Background

By 1944, the two major resistance movements in occupied Greece, EDES and EAM-ELAS, each saw the other as the main adversary. They both recognized the fact that it was only a matter of time before the Germans evacuated the country. For the communists, the British represented their major opponent.

By the summer of 1944, the Soviet forces advancing into Romania and towards Yugoslavia meant that the Germans still in the Balkans were at risk of being cut off. In September, General Fyodor Tolbukhin's armies advanced into Bulgaria, forcing the resignation of the country's pro-Nazi government and the establishment of a pro-Communist regime, and the withdrawal of Bulgarian troops from Greek Macedonia. The Axis withdrawal, before the exiled government could return to the country, created a power vacuum. The government-in-exile, now led by the prominent liberal George Papandreou, moved to Italy, in preparation for its return to Greece. Under the Caserta Agreement of September 1944, all resistance forces in Greece were to be placed under the command of a British officer, General Ronald Scobie.

According to historian Donny Gluckstein, Scobie sought to delay the German withdrawal in order to prevent ELAS from establishing control the country. He cites German plenipotentiary Hermann Neubacher for this claim.

The British arrived in Greece in October (Operation Manna) with the exiled Greek government and some units of the Greek army, led by General Thrasyvoulos Tsakalotos. By then, the Germans were in full retreat, and most of Greece's territory had already been liberated by Greek partisans.

On October 13, British troops entered Athens and Papandreou and his ministers followed six days later. King George II stayed in Cairo because Papandreou had promised that the future of the monarchy would be decided by referendum.

There was little to prevent ELAS from taking full control of the country. With the German withdrawal, ELAS units had taken control of the countryside and most of the cities. However, they did not take full control because the KKE leadership was instructed by the Soviet Union not to precipitate a crisis that could jeopardize Allied unity and put Stalin's larger postwar objectives at risk. Unlike their leaders, ELAS's fighters and rank-and-file were not aware of these instructions, and it became a source of conflict within both EAM and ELAS.

Following Stalin's instructions, the KKE leadership tried to avoid a confrontation with the Papandreou government. Most ELAS members saw the British as liberators despite some KKE leaders, such as Andreas Tzimas and Aris Velouchiotis. Tzimas was in touch with Yugoslav Communist leader Josip Broz Tito, and he disagreed with ELAS's cooperation with the British forces.

The issue of disarming the resistance organizations was a cause of friction between the Papandreou government and its EAM members. Advised by British ambassador Reginald Leeper, Papandreou demanded the disarmament of all armed forces apart from the Sacred Band and the III Mountain Brigade, which were formed following the suppression of the April 1944 Egypt mutiny, and two equal numbered corps of ELAS and EDES that would take part in operations against the Germans (still occupying Crete), such as the constitution of a National Guard under government control.

EAM, believing that it would leave the guerillas of ELAS defenseless against anticommunist militias, submitted an alternative plan of total and simultaneous disarmament. Papandreou rejected this plan, causing EAM's ministers to resign from the government on December 2.

On December 1, Scobie had issued a proclamation calling for the dissolution of ELAS. Command of ELAS was the KKE's greatest source of strength, and the KKE leader Siantos decided that the demand for ELAS's dissolution must be resisted.

Tito's influence may have played some role in ELAS's resistance to disarmament. Tito was outwardly loyal to Stalin but had come to power through his own means and believed that the Communists in Greece should do the same. His influence, however, had not prevented the EAM leadership from putting its forces under Scobie's command a couple of months earlier, in accordance with the Caserta Agreement. Meanwhile, following Georgios Grivas's instructions, Organization X members had set up outposts in central Athens and resisted EAM for several days until British troops arrived, as their leader had been promised.

The events

According to the Caserta Agreement, all Greek forces were under the Allied command of Scobie. On December 1, 1944, the Greek government of "National Unity" under Georgios Papandreou and Gen. Scobie (British head of the Allied forces in Greece at that time) announced an ultimatum for the general disarmament of all guerrilla forces by 10 December, excluding those allied to the government (the 3rd Greek Mountain Brigade and the Sacred Band) and also a part of EDES and ELAS that would be used in Allied operations in Crete and the Dodecanese (still under German occupation), if it was necessary. As a result, on December 2, six ministers of the EAM, most of whom were KKE members, resigned from their positions in the "National Unity" government. The EAM called for a general strike and a demonstration in front of the Greek parliament for the next day, December 3.

The demonstration involved at least 200,000 people marching on Panepistimiou Street towards the Syntagma Square. British tanks along with Greek police units had been scattered around the area, blocking the way of the demonstrators.

The shootings began when the marchers had arrived at the Tomb of the Unknown Soldier, in front of the Royal palace, above Syntagma Square. They originated from the streets, from the building of the General Police Headquarters, from the Parliament (Vouli), from the Hotel Grande Bretagne (where international observers had settled), from other governmental buildings and from policemen on the street. Among many testimonies, N. Farmakis, then a fifteen-year old member of the Anti-EAM Organization X participating in the shootings, described that he saw the head of the police Angelos Evert giving the order to open fire on the crowd, by means of a handkerchief waved from the window. The sharpshooters had been given a standing order, according to Farmakis, "Don't fire as they are marching, at least up to the Tomb of the Unknown Soldier. When they march to the Tomb of the Unknown Soldier, open fire!" Although there are no accounts hinting that the crowd indeed possessed guns, the British commander Woodhouse insisted that it was uncertain whether the first shots were fired by the police or the demonstrators. LIFE photographer Dmitri Kessel, who witnessed the shooting, reported that the "police fired without provocation". More than 28 demonstrators were killed, and 148 were injured. This signalled the beginning of the Dekemvriana ("the December events"), a 37-day period of full-scale fighting in Athens between EAM fighters and smaller parts of ELAS, and the forces of the British army and the government.

At the beginning the government had only a few policemen and gendarmes, some militia units, the 3rd Greek Mountain Brigade—distinguished at the Gothic Line offensive in Italy, which, however, lacked heavy weapons — and the royalist group Organization X, also known as "Chítes", which was accused by EAM of collaborating with the Nazis. Consequently, the British intervened in support of the Greek government, deploying artillery and aircraft to reinforce their position as the battle approached its last stages.

In the early morning hours of December 4, ELAS reservists began operations in the Athens–Piraeus area, attacking Grivas' X forces and many police stations with success. In the evening, a peaceful demonstration and funeral procession took place by EAM members. Government forces took no action but the procession was attacked by Chites led by Colonel Grivas, with over 100 dead. Also on December 4, Papandreou gave his resignation to the British Commander, Gen. Scobie, who rejected it.

By December 12, ΕΑΜ was in control of most of Athens, Piraeus and the suburbs. The government and British forces were confined only in the centre of Athens, in an area that was ironically called Scobia (Scobie's country) by the guerillas.

The British, alarmed by the initial successes of EAM/ELAS and outnumbered, flew in the 4th Indian Infantry Division from Italy as emergency reinforcements. They also transferred John Hawkesworth from Italy to Athens, as assistant to Scobie, who soon took the general command.

Although the British were openly fighting against EAM in Athens, there were no such battles in the rest of the big cities. In certain cases, such as Volos, some RAF units even surrendered equipment to ELAS fighters.. It seems that ELAS preferred to avoid an armed confrontation with the British forces initially and later tried to reduce the conflict as much as possible, although poor communication between its many independent units around the country might also have played a role. This might explain the simultaneous skirmishes with the British, the large-scale ELAS operations against trotskyists, anarchists and other political dissidents in Athens, and the many contradictory decisions of EAM leaders. Videlicet, KKE's leadership, was supporting a doctrine of "national unity" while eminent members, such as Leonidas Stringos, Theodoros Makridis and even Georgios Siantos, were creating revolutionary plans. Even more curiously, Tito was both the KKE's key sponsor and a key British ally, owing his physical and political survival in 1944 to British assistance.

Churchill in Athens

This outbreak of fighting between Allied forces and an anti-German European resistance movement while the war in Europe was still being fought was a serious political problem for Churchill's coalition government in Britain and caused much protest in the British press and the House of Commons. To prove his peacemaking intentions to the public, Churchill went to Athens with General Alexander, Anthony Eden and Harold Macmillan at Christmas (December 25), to preside over a conference to bring about a settlement, in which Soviet representatives (Popov) also participated.

The conference was to take place in the Hotel Grande Bretagne. Later, it became known that there was a plan by the EAM to blow up the building, aiming to kill the participants, which was finally cancelled. Instead the conference took place in Phaliro, on the cruiser Ajax. From the Greek side Siantos, Partsalidis, Mantakas and Sofianopoulos took part for EAM and Regent Damaskinos, Papandreou, Panagiotis Kanellopoulos, Sofoulis, Kafantaris, Dimitris Maximos, Stefanos Stefanopoulos, Gonatas, Tsaldaris and as a special personality Nikolaos Plastiras for the government. It failed because the EAM/ELAS demands were considered excessive.

Meanwhile, the Soviet Union remained passive about developments in Greece. True to the informal Percentages agreement struck between Stalin and Churchill that placed Greece in the British sphere of influence, the Soviet delegation in Greece did not encourage or discourage the EAM's ambitions. The delegation's chief gained the nickname "sphinx" among local Communist officers for not giving any clues about Soviet intentions. Pravda did not mention the clashes at all.

By early January, EAM forces had lost the battle. Despite Churchill's intervention, Papandreou resigned and was replaced by General Nikolaos Plastiras. On 15 January 1945, Scobie agreed to a ceasefire in exchange for the ELAS's withdrawal from its positions at Patras and Thessaloniki and its demobilization in the Peloponnese.

Aftermath
The communist guerillas, led by Siantos, evacuated the capital taking thousands of hostages. During their retreat to central Greece, many of them died from the cold or hardships. Circa 13,000 members of EAM/ELAS had also been arrested by the British and handed over to the Greek authorities.

The new government of Plastiras and the Communist party signed in February 1945 the Treaty of Varkiza in an effort of accord.

On January 25, 1945, a mass grave of some 200 people was found in Athens. Examiners estimated the bodies to be a month to 6 weeks old, which aligns with the period of the ELAS occupation of the area. None of the 200 were executed by gunshot, instead they were executed with hatchets, blunt instruments, or by stoning.

People
Participants with the EAM/ELAS side included among others Kostas Axelos, Iannis Xenakis, Manolis Glezos, Apostolos Santas, Mikis Theodorakis, Memos Makris Aimilios Veakis, Dimitris Partsalidis, Helene Ahrweiler and Nikos Koundouros.

Participants with the government/British side included Anastasios Peponis, Stylianos Pattakos, Konstantinos Ventiris and Panagiotis Spiliotopoulos.

References

Further reading

Greece in World War II
Greek Civil War
1944 in Greece
1945 in Greece
Conflicts in 1944
Conflicts in 1945
20th century in Athens
Battles and operations of the Greek Civil War
Land battles and operations of World War II involving the United Kingdom
Mediterranean theatre of World War II
Military history of Athens
.
1944 protests
1945 protests
December 1944 events
January 1945 events in Europe
Georgios Papandreou